Guapira is a genus of Neotropical shrubs in four o'clock family. Its species are native to Mesoamerica, South America, the West Indies, and the extreme southern part of Florida.

Species

References

Nyctaginaceae
Caryophyllales genera
Taxonomy articles created by Polbot